Robert 'Rob' Dobbins (born 1940) is a former Australian international lawn bowler and coach.

He won a gold medal in the fours at the 1982 Commonwealth Games in Brisbane with Keith Poole, Bert Sharp and Don Sherman. He coached the Australian team at the 2002 Commonwealth Games.

In 1981, he won the Hong Kong International Bowls Classic pairs title.

References

1940 births
Living people
Australian male bowls players
Commonwealth Games medallists in lawn bowls
Commonwealth Games gold medallists for Australia
People from Newcastle, New South Wales
Bowls players at the 1982 Commonwealth Games
Sportsmen from New South Wales
20th-century Australian people
Medallists at the 1982 Commonwealth Games